Raised on Rock may refer to:

 Raised on Rock / For Ol' Times Sake (issued also as simply Raised on Rock), a 1973 album by Elvis Presley
 "Raised on Rock" (song), the title track
 Raised on Rock (Voodoo Circle album), 2018
 "Raised on Rock" (Scorpions song), 2010